Gullpucken (translit. the Golden puck) is awarded by the Norwegian Ice Hockey Federation (NIHF) to the best Norwegian ice hockey player each year. The award is subject to consideration which means it is not necessarily awarded every year. Its inception year was 1959, when Leif Solberg of Furuset became its first recipient. Patrick Thoresen was the last who received the award in 2009.

The NIHF also awards the Valemon trophy to the best Norwegian female ice hockey player. It has been awarded twice, the last time was in 2003.

Winners

2013: Lars Haugen, HK Dinamo Minsk and Andrea Dalen, North Dakota University
2012: Patrick Thoresen, SKA St. Petersburg
2011: Anders Bastiansen, Färjestad BK
2010: Mats Zuccarello Aasen, MODO Hockey
2009: Patrick Thoresen, HC Lugano
2008: Mats Trygg, Kölner Haie
2007: Anders Bastiansen, Mora IK
2006: Tore Vikingstad, DEG Metro Stars
2005: Tommy Jakobsen
2004: no award
2003: Tommy Jakobsen, DEG Metro Stars
2002: Mats Trygg, Färjestads BK
2001: no award
2000: Pål Johnsen, Storhamar Dragons
1999: Svein Enok Nørstebø, Trondheim Black Panthers
1998: Morten Finstad, Stjernen Hockey
1997: Petter Salsten, Storhamar Dragons
1996: Ole Eskil Dahlstøm, Storhamar Dragons
1995: Trond Magnussen, Lillehammer IK
1994: Espen Knutsen, Vålerenga Ishockey
1993: Jim Marthinsen, Vålerenga Ishockey
1992: Jon Magne Karlstad, Vålerenga Ishockey
1991: Geir Hoff, Furuset Ishockey
1990: Stephen Foyn, Sparta Warriors
1989: Jim Marthinsen, Trondheim Black Panthers
1988: Petter Salsten, Furuset Ishockey
1987: Ørjan Løvdal, Stjernen Hockey
1986: Ørjan Løvdal, Stjernen Hockey

1985: Erik Kristiansen, Storhamar Dragons
1984: Øyvind Løsamoen, Storhamar Dragons
1983: Trond Abrahamsen, Manglerud Star Ishockey
1982: Geir Myhre, Sparta Warriors
1981: Bjørn Skaare, Furuset Ishockey
1980: Geir Myhre, Hasle-Løren Ishockey
1979: Morten Sethereng, Frisk Tigers
1978: Roar Øfstedal, Manglerud Star Ishockey
1977: Jørn Goldstein, Manglerud Star Ishockey
1976: Svein Pedersen, Hasle-Løren Ishockey
1975: Morten Johansen, Frisk Tigers
1974: Jan Kinder, Hasle-Løren Ishockey
1973: Arne Mikkelsen, Vålerenga Ishockey
1972: Steinar Bjølbakk, Vålerenga Ishockey
1971: Terje Thoen, Sinsen IF
1970: Steinar Bjølbakk, Vålerenga Ishockey
1969: Georg Smefjell, Tigrene
1968: Olav Dalsøren, Tigrene
1967: Jan Erik Solberg, Jar IL
1966: Per Skjerwen Olsen, Vålerenga Ishockey
1965: Thor Martinsen, Skeid Ishockey
1964: Chr. Petersen, Forward Flyers
1963: Einar Bruno Larsen, Vålerenga Ishockey
1962: Roar Bakke, Forward Flyers
1961: Knut Nygård, Skeid Ishockey
1961: Egil Bjerklund, Hasle-Løren Ishockey
1960: Tor Gundersen, Vålerenga Ishockey
1959: Leif Solheim, Furuset Ishockey

External links
 List of Gullpucken winners

Norwegian ice hockey trophies and awards
Norway
Awards established in 1959
1959 establishments in Norway